Albu Hesar (also Romanized as Albū Ḩeşār; also known as Majīd) is a village in Hoseyni Rural District, in the Central District of Shadegan County, Khuzestan Province, Iran. At the 2006 census, its population was 625, in 92 families.

References 

Populated places in Shadegan County